Istanbul Bahçelievler Anatolian High School (German: Anatolisches Gymnasium Bahcelievler, Turkish: Bahçelievler Anadolu Lisesi) is an elite public high school recognized by German authorities as a Deutsche Auslandsschule, located in Bahçelievler, Istanbul, Turkey. It is one of the most selective high schools in Turkey.

References 

High schools in Istanbul
Educational institutions established in 1985
1985 establishments in Turkey
German-language schools
Anatolian High Schools